47 Natkal is a 1981 Indian Tamil-language drama film written and directed by K. Balachander. It was simultaneously made in  Telugu as 47 Rojulu. The film stars Chiranjeevi, Jaya Prada, and Anne Patricia. Based on the novel of the same name by Sivasankari, it revolves around Vaishali (Jaya Prada) and how her marriage to Kumar (Chiranjeevi) lasts only 47 days. The Tamil version was released on 17 July 1981 and the Telugu version on 3 September 1981.

Plot 
Actress Saritha comes to a small town to talk to Vaishali, because she is about to play her in a film based on her life. Vaishali suffers from hysteria and angrily shuts out Saritha. The story is now told in flashback form, when Vaishali's brother tells Saritha about her marriage to Kumar, lasting for only 47 days. Kumar takes Vaishali to a country manor in a town 30 km away from Paris, France (Férolles). She does not know French or English. Kumar already has a French first wife Lucie living there on the top floor. He deceives both his wives: He tells Vaishali that Lucy is a friend, while he tells Lucy that Vaishali is his sister. Eventually, Vaishali figures out his bigamy and wishes not to stay with him as his second wife/ mistress. She does not know of anyone who knows her language and who can help her escape.

Kumar tortures and threatens her to make her act as his mentally deranged sister. He treats her in a very sadistic manner unacceptable to any human in the world at all. He uses his cigarette to burn her fingers, burns her palm on the stove and takes her to watch a porn film since she did not want to sleep in the same bed as him.  A pickpocket sees Kumar abusing Vaishali and tells her about an Indian doctor named Shankar who maybe able to help her. In the meantime, Vaishali becomes pregnant, and Kumar is afraid that Lucy will discover his deception. He tries to force Vaishali to have an unsafe and uncivil abortion. Dr. Shanker rescues her and tells Lucy everything about Kumar's bigamy. Lucy ends their marriage by throwing her ring into the river. Dr. Shanker brings Vaishali back to India; she moves back in with her brother and mother. No mention is made as to what happened to her pregnancy and no baby is seen or heard. It is presumed that she may have later had an abortion, since she did not want to be connected to her ex-husband Kumar in any way whatsoever. When Saritha asks why she didn't remarry (perhaps to her rescuer Dr. Shanker), Vaishali, clearly pissed off by the question, angrily replies that a woman does not always have to be married. However, she placates Saritha by saying that she wouldn't mind if her character is shown as remarried in the film.

Cast 
 Chiranjeevi as Kumar
 Jaya Prada as Vaishali
 Anne Patricia as Lucy
 Rama Prabha
 Jayasri
 Prameela
 Varalakshmi
 Sarath Babu as Shankar
 Nazeem
 Chakrapani
 Ramana Murthi
 G. P. Ramanath
 Saritha as herself (uncredited)

Production 
While completing the shoot of Ninaithale Inikkum at Singapore, R. Venkatraman of Premalaya Pictures expressed his desire to K. Balachander of producing a film made in foreign locations which have not been exploited by anyone yet. Balachander decided to adapt the novel 47 Natkal as the film. The novel by Sivasankari was serialised in the magazine Idayam Pesukirathu. Sivasankari is also credited for the film's dialogues. The film marked Telugu actor Chiranjeevi's Tamil debut, and was simultaneously filmed in Telugu as 47 Rojulu. Unlike the novel which was set in the United States, Balachander decided to change the film's setting to Paris to make use of the ancient arts, buildings and modern conditions of that country came together to form the plot of the screenplay. Major filming was held in Paris and its surroundings and was completed within 35 days.

Soundtrack 
The soundtrack was composed by M. S. Viswanathan, while the Tamil lyrics were penned by Kannadasan. For the Telugu version, the lyrics were penned by Aatreya.

Release and reception 
47 Natkal was released on 17 July 1981, and 47 Rojulu on 3 September 1981. Sindhu and Jeeva of Kalki negatively reviewed 47 Natkal, saying it was not as entertaining or exciting as the novel.

References

External links 
 

1980s Tamil-language films
1980s Telugu-language films
1981 drama films
1981 films
1981 multilingual films
Films based on Indian novels
Films directed by K. Balachander
Films scored by M. S. Viswanathan
Films set in Paris
Films shot in Paris
Films with screenplays by K. Balachander
Indian drama films
Indian multilingual films